Hypocalymma tetrapterum is a member of the family Myrtaceae endemic to Western Australia.

It blooms in August producing white flowers.

It is found on riverbanks and breakaways in the Wheatbelt region of Western Australia in an area centered around Dandaragan where it grows in sandy-loamy soils with lateritic gravel.

References

tetrapterum
Endemic flora of Western Australia
Rosids of Western Australia
Vulnerable flora of Australia
Plants described in 1862
Taxa named by Nikolai Turczaninow